Tempah may refer to:
 Tempeh, a traditional soy product
 Tinie Tempah, a British rapper

See also
 Tempa (disambiguation)
 Tampa (disambiguation)